Franck Béria (born 23 May 1983) is a French former professional footballer who played as a right-back. He works as a director of professional football at Lille.

Club career
At the end of the 2016–17 season, Béria ended his career as a player.

International career
Béria was born in France and is of Malagasy descent. He is a one-time youth international for the France U19s in a 4–0 win over Albania's U19s. He represented the France U21s at the 2004 Toulon tournament.

Honours
Lille
Ligue 1: 2010–11
Coupe de France: 2010–11

References

External links

1983 births
Living people
Sportspeople from Argenteuil
French sportspeople of Malagasy descent
French footballers
Footballers from Val-d'Oise
Association football defenders
France youth international footballers
Ligue 1 players
Ligue 2 players
FC Metz players
Lille OSC players
Lille OSC non-playing staff
Black French sportspeople